Desperado: The Soundtrack is the film score to Robert Rodriguez’s Desperado. It was written and performed by the Los Angeles rock bands, Los Lobos and Tito & Tarantula, performing traditional Ranchera and Chicano rock  music. Other artists on the soundtrack album include Dire Straits, Link Wray, Latin Playboys, and Carlos Santana. Musician Tito Larriva has a small role in the film, and his band, Tito & Tarantula, contributed to the soundtrack as well.

The album track "Mariachi Suite" by Los Lobos was awarded a Grammy for Best Pop Instrumental Performance at the 1995 Grammy Awards.

Track listing
"Canción del Mariachi" ("Morena de Mi Corazón") (Los Lobos and Antonio Banderas)  2:06
"Six Blade Knife" (Dire Straits)  4:34
"Jack the Ripper" (Link Wray)  2:31
"Manifold de Amour" (Latin Playboys)  2:03
"Forever Night Shade Mary" (Latin Playboys)  3:00
"Pass the Hatchet" (Roger & The Gypsies)  3:00
"Bar Fight" (Los Lobos)  1:54
"Strange Face of Love" (Tito & Tarantula)  5:51
"Bucho's Gracias/Navajas Attacks" (Los Lobos)  3:56
"Bulletproof" (Los Lobos)  1:42
"Bella" (Carlos Santana)  4:29
"Quédate Aquí" (Salma Hayek)  2:05
"Rooftop Action" (Los Lobos)  1:36
"Phone Call" (Los Lobos)  2:16
"White Train (Showdown)" (Tito & Tarantula)  5:57
"Back to the House That Love Built" (Tito & Tarantula)  4:41
"Let Love Reign" (Los Lobos)  3:22
"Mariachi Suite" (Los Lobos)  4:22

Personnel 

Tom Baker – mastering
Antonio Banderas – speech
Steve Berlin – mixing
Richard Bosworth – engineer, mixing engineer
Steve Buscemi – speech
Bill Jackson – engineer, mixing
Tito Larriva – producer
Los Lobos – producer
Cheech Marin – speech
Charlie Midnight – producer
Thom Panunzio – mixing
Karyn Rachtman – executive producer
Robert Rodriguez – executive producer
Cesar Rosas – engineer
Carlos Santana – performer
Quentin Tarantino – speech
David Tickle – mixing

References

External links

Mexico Trilogy
Los Lobos albums
1995 soundtrack albums
Action film soundtracks